Namdar (also Romanized as Nāmdār; also known as Nāmdārābād) is a village in Yusefvand Rural District, in the Central District of Selseleh County, Lorestan Province, Iran. As of the 2006 census, its population was 58, in 14 families.

References 

Towns and villages in Selseleh County